KORB is a non-commercial educational broadcast radio station licensed to and serving Hopland, California.  KORB is owned and operated by One Ministries, Inc. which also owns and operates TV stations KQSL in Fort Bragg and KKPM-CD in Yuba City.

KORB broadcasts a Christian preaching format branded as "K-FAITH 103.1".

History
This station received its original construction permit for a new FM station in Redwood Valley, California, from the Federal Communications Commission on April 25, 2005.  The new station was assigned the call letters KAIS by the FCC on May 2, 2005.  In December 2007, the station was granted permission to change its community of license to Hopland, California.

In October 2008, the Educational Media Foundation reached an agreement to transfer this station to One Ministries, Inc., as part of a complicated multi-station deal.  The deal was approved by the FCC on November 20, 2008, and the transaction was consummated on December 9, 2008.  The new owners applied to the FCC for new call letters and were assigned KORB on November 28, 2008.

In March 2009, KORB kicked off its morning show with the station's first on air DJ, Costas Schuler.

On June 1, 2022, KORB changed its format to Christian preaching, branded as "K-FAITH 103.1", fed on translator K276FY.

Translators

References

External links
 Broken FM Online
 Broken FM's Official Blog
 

ORB
Radio stations established in 2008
Companies based in Mendocino County, California